Nilhad is a village in Pindi Gheb Tehsil of Attock District in Punjab Province of Pakistan.

References

Villages in Attock District